5 Advanced Ordnance Depot (5 AOD) was a short lived Royal Australian Army Ordnance Corps and Royal New Zealand Army Ordnance Corps combined Depot in Singapore 1970 to 1971.

5 AOD
As a result of the Five Power Defence Arrangements (FPDA). 5 AOD was formed by Australia and New Zealand in 1970 to support the Australian and New Zealand Forces remaining in Singapore post the British withdrawal.

5 AOD was set up from scratch in  March 1970 and as the first order of business finding working accommodation was a priority. The Singapore authorities were unwilling to provide suitable accommodation in any of the recently vacated British facility’s, so as a temporary measure 5 AOD was housed with the Royal Army Ordnance Corps (RAOC), 3 Base Ordnance Depot (3 BOD) at Alexandria and Keat Hong.
Eventually 5 AOD was located at Transit Shed No 4 at the Sembawang Naval Basin on 15 July 1970.

In-scaling of stores was achieved by assuming the responsibilities of the Australian Cell of 3 BOD and their existing stocks. Additional stocks were delivered direct from Australia by HMAS Jeparit. By October 1970 5 AOD was functioning as a unit.

The Strength of 5 AOD in September 1970 was:
10 Officers
38 Other Ranks
58 Locally Employed Civilians (LECs)
New Zealand strength within 5 AOD averaged two Officers and 18 Other Ranks.

The Officer Commanding go 5 AOD was:
Major N.W Spencer RAAOC

In 1971 the United Kingdom decided that’s its forces were to remain in Singapore and as an economy measure it would be sensible to have a combined UK, Australian and New Zealand Ordnance Depot and as a result 5 AOD ceased to exist on Aug 1971 and its responsibility, personnel and stock absorbed by the new ANZUK Ordnance Depot.

See also
 Royal Australian Army Ordnance Corps
 Royal New Zealand Army Ordnance Corps
 Military history of New Zealand
 Military history of New Zealand in Malaysia
 New Zealand in the Vietnam War
 Military history of Australia during the Vietnam War
 28th Commonwealth Infantry Brigade Group
 ANZUK
 Commonwealth Ordnance Services in Malaya and Singapore

References

Further reading
  Ian McGibbon (Ed.), (2000). The Oxford Companion to New Zealand Military History.

External links
  ANZ Military Brats Singapore
  South East Asia Veterans Organisation
  RAAOC History
 To the Warrior his Arms A History of the RNZAOC and its predecessors

Military units and formations of the New Zealand Army
Ordnance (stores) units and formations
Military units and formations established in 1970
Military units and formations disestablished in 1971
5 New Zealand Adv Ord Depot